International Dark Sky Week (formerly the National Dark Sky Week) is held during the week of the new moon in April, when people worldwide may turn off their lights to observe the beauty of the night sky without light pollution. This event was founded in 2003 by high school student Jennifer Barlow of Midlothian, Virginia. It has been endorsed by the International Dark-Sky Association, the American Astronomical Society, the Astronomical League, and Sky & Telescope.

Goal
The goals of the event are to:
 Temporarily reduce light pollution and raise awareness about its effects on the night sky,
 Encourage the use of better lighting systems that direct light downward instead of into the sky, and
 Promote the study of astronomy.

This event always occurs in April, during the week of the new moon so that the sky can be as dark as possible for optimum viewing conditions.

Jennifer Barlow states, "The night sky is a gift of such tremendous beauty that should not be hidden under a blanket of wasted light. It should be visible so that future generations do not lose touch with the wonder of our universe." Barlow explains, "It is my wish that people see the night sky in all of its glory, without excess light in the sky as our ancestors saw it hundreds of years ago."

Participation
Willing participants in this project turn off all unnecessary lighting indoors and outdoors sources in order to reduce light pollution of the night sky.

The International Dark-Sky Association encourages light users to take precautions against outdoor light pollution by:

 Using outdoor light only when needed
Confine light to specific areas 
Be aware that lights need only be as bright as it is necessary
Reducing the amount of blue light emissions used
Use of lighting that faces downward, in order to avoid over illumination, called fully shielded fixtures

Types of light pollution
Light pollution is a broad term used to define excess artificial light that brightens the night sky. Types of light pollution which include:
 Skyglow, a hazy glow produced by the reflection water molecules in the air that encompasses cities which prevent the night sky to be fully seen. 
 Light trespass is a condition in which light is oriented into areas in which it is not needed. A common example is street lighting projecting in all directions including the sky which creates a hazy reflection upon the night sky, making it difficult for star observation. 
 Over-illumination is the excess supply of light used beyond what is necessary for safety and efficiency. 
 Light clutter which refers to the common organizational groupings of lights in cities and roadways. 
 Glare is an impeding bright light which cause temporary impairments to human sight. There are three classifications of glare, blinding glare, disability glare and discomfort glare.

Implications of light pollution
Light pollution is the adverse effects of artificial light.

Affected parties of light pollution include:

Astronomers:

By increasing the number of participants, the quality of viewing the sky and stars will be temporarily improved. This is of benefit to astronomers who are faced with light pollution issues such as light trespass and skyglow.

Nocturnal wildlife:

Several animal species have been documented to be affected by light pollution. The glare of street lights causes distraction to nocturnal birds in flight, leading to bird crashes into sky scrapers and buildings. The use of light may also cause birds to reproduce or migrate too early. The feeding behavior of insects, bats, sea turtles, fish, and reptiles reflect alterations by artificial light. Sea turtles mistake the glow of electric lights for the shimmer of the ocean, leading them to flock outside of their nest into hazardous areas.

Human circadian rhythm and sleep patterns:

Exposure to light during traditional sleeping hours are documented to cause disruptions in the circadian rhythm that regulate human sleep cycles. Biologists have noted a decrease in the amount of melatonin, a natural hormone that regulates the Circadian rhythm, in humans that are exposed to light pollution of the night sky. In order to prevent major impact, biologists suggest increasing the amount of natural light exposure during the day and decreasing the amount of electrical light consumed at night.

Growth patterns of plants and trees:

The growing pattern of trees have been disrupted and less adjusted to seasonal changes in weather and light exposure.

Waste of economic resources:

Leaving lights on that are not in use can lead to the waste of economic cost expenditures. Conservation and efficiency is necessary for environmental responsibility. The invention of LED lights, dimmers, motion sensors and times have reduced the amount of energy used.

Legislation
The best way to take action to promote dark skies is to get involved in local government. There are templates for light ordinances that can legally ban the use of harmful lights and limit commercial lighting to a specific curfew. Currently, there are no nationwide standards regarding light pollution. However, select cities across the United States and Canada are taking initiative to facilitate dark sky cities in order to reduce light pollution and view the night sky within city limits.

Event dates

See also

 Dark-sky movement
 Earth Hour
 National Astronomy Week
 Noctcaelador
 White House Astronomy Night
 Light pollution
 Bortle scale

References

External links

>
Environmental awareness days
Awareness weeks
2003 establishments in the United States
April observances
Recurring events established in 2003
Unofficial observances
Astronomy education events